Edward L. Bishop is a Canadian author and academic. A professor of English literature and film studies at the University of Alberta, his first non-academic publication was Riding with Rilke: Reflections on Motorcycles and Books, a travel memoir which was a Canadian bestseller in 2005 and a finalist for the 2005 Governor General's Award for English non-fiction, and won the MAX Award (Motorcycle Award of Excellence) for best Motorcycle Book and Wilfred Eggleston Award for Non-Fiction.

Works

Notes

References

Canadian non-fiction writers
Living people
Academic staff of the University of Alberta
Motorcycle touring writers
Year of birth missing (living people)